Darja Lisjak is a Slovenian material scientist and professor at the Department for Material Synthesis at Jozef Stefan Institute in Ljubljana, Slovenia. Her work focuses on materials chemistry, nanotechnology, and solid-state chemistry.

Education and career 
Lisjak earned her PhD in chemistry and chemical technology from the University of Ljubljana in 1999.

Selected publications 

 Mertelj, Alenka, et al. "Ferromagnetism in suspensions of magnetic platelets in liquid crystal." Nature 504.7479 (2013): 237-241.
 Lisjak, Darja, and Alenka Mertelj. "Anisotropic magnetic nanoparticles: A review of their properties, syntheses and potential applications." Progress in Materials Science 95 (2018): 286-328.
 Mertelj, Alenka, et al. "Magneto-optic and converse magnetoelectric effects in a ferromagnetic liquid crystal." Soft Matter 10.45 (2014): 9065-9072.

References

External links 	

 

Women materials scientists and engineers
University of Ljubljana alumni
Slovenian women scientists
21st-century Slovenian women
Year of birth missing (living people)
Living people